The Innovate Wrestling Television Championship is a secondary title in the American wrestling promotion Innovate Pro Wrestling. On August 19, 2017; promoter Tony Givens announced at ReGenesis that Smoky Mountain was pulling out of the NWA thus the promotion was changing names.  Axton Ray was the reigning NWA Smoky Mountain Television Champion and was declared the Innovate Wrestling Television Champion as a result.

Title history

Combined reigns

References

Television wrestling championships